In typesetting, a forme (or form) is imposed by a stoneman working on a flat imposition stone when he assembles the loose components of a page (or number of simultaneously printed pages) into a locked arrangement, inside a chase, ready for printing.

If metal type is kept locked up in the typeset document for long periods to allow reprint, this is called "standing type".

See also
 History of western typography
 Typography

References

Typography
Letterpress printing